The Asiago Astrophysical Observatory (Osservatorio Astrofisico di Asiago, or Asiago Observatory for short) is an Italian astronomical observatory (IAU code 043) owned and operated by the University of Padua. Founded in 1942, it is located on the plateau of Asiago, 90 kilometers northwest of Padua, near the town of Asiago. Its main instrument is the 1.22-meter Galilei telescope, currently used only for spectrometric observations.

The observatory saw the construction of a 1:1 scale model of the European Extremely Large Telescope's primary mirror.

Cima Ekar Observing Station 

The nearby Cima Ekar Observing Station is located approximately 3.8 kilometers to the southeast on Mount Ekar. It has the observatory code 098. Cima Ekar also participates in the Asiago-DLR Asteroid Survey, a prominent international dedicated programme to search and follow-up asteroids and comets, with special emphasis on near-Earth objects.

See also 
 Merate Astronomical Observatory
 Telescopio Nazionale Galileo (TNG), 3.5m (138 inch) diameter aperture Italian National telescope.
 List of astronomical observatories
 List of largest optical reflecting telescopes

References

External links 
 Asiago Astrophysical Observatory

University of Padua
Asiago
Buildings and structures in the Province of Padua